"Take Me to Your World" is a 1968 single written by Billy Sherrill and Glenn Sutton and recorded by Tammy Wynette.  "Take Me to Your World" was Tammy Wynette's second number one on the country charts as a solo artist.  The single stayed at number one for a single week and spent a total of fourteen weeks on the country chart.

Chart performance

Other versions
Patti Page included the song on her album Gentle on My Mind (1968)

Jean Shepard recorded the song for her album A Real Good Woman (1968)

George Jones recorded the song as "I'll Take You To My World" on his album "George Jones" (1972)

References
 

1967 singles
Tammy Wynette songs
Songs written by Billy Sherrill
Songs written by Glenn Sutton
Song recordings produced by Billy Sherrill
Epic Records singles
1967 songs